Giro City is a 1982 British television drama film written and directed by Karl Francis. It stars Glenda Jackson, Jon Finch and Kenneth Colley. The film was released in the United States under the title And Nothing But the Truth in 1984.

Plot
A team of reporters come up against censorship when they pursue a story.

Cast
 Glenda Jackson - Sophie
 Jon Finch - O'Mally
 Kenneth Colley - Martin
 James Donnelly - James
 Karen Archer - Brigitte
 Graham Berry - TV10 Cameraman
 Chris Renty - TV10 Soundman
 David Quilter - TV10 Lawyer
 Peter Halliday - Government Minister
 Simon Coady - Awards Compere
 Emrys James - Tommy Williams
 Simon Jones - Henderson
 Michael Lees - GNH Chairman
 Bruce Alexander - GNH Lawyer
 David Beames - Joe
 Sharon Morgan - Social Worker

Production
The budget was £441,000.

References

External links

1982 films
1982 drama films
British drama films
1980s English-language films
Films directed by Karl Francis
1980s British films